The Shape of Snakes (2000) is a crime novel by English writer Minette Walters. The story won Denmark's Pelle Rosencrantz Award.

Synopsis
In 1978, a black woman known as 'Mad Annie' by her neighbours was found dead in a west London gutter, her body discovered by Mrs. Ranelagh who, despite supposedly not knowing the dead woman, spends the next twenty years trying to convince the police that she was murdered. However, those once familiar with Annie despised her as a mean old eccentric and animal abuser, whilst Ranelagh's husband seemingly disdains any mention of the case.

External links
More about The Shape of Snakes on Walters' website
Agent's dedicated page

2000 British novels
Novels by Minette Walters
Novels set in London
Fiction set in 1978
Macmillan Publishers books